Thaha Madayi (also spelt as Taha Madayi) is a freelance journalist/writer and biographer from Kerala, India, writing in Malayalam language. He began contributing to Ballapankthi of Mathrubhumi weekly and has gone on to author many articles on significant topics, which appeared in leading Malayalam journals. He was instrumental in making visible Dalits and other marginalized groups through the literary genre of life-writing and has also published his interviews with many celebrities. He has made six documentary films and short films. He has presented cultural programs both on Radio and TV. He wrote the biographies of Kallen Pokkudan, Fabi Basheer, Gemini Shankaran, Mamukkoya, Punathil Kunjabdulla, Eranjoli Moosa, A Ayyappan and Captain Krishnan Nair.

He has written pieces for Malayalam weekly like Mathrubhumi and Madhyamam.

His interview with M.N. Vijayan was discussed in Kerala Cultural-Political scenario in a wider range.
Thaha Madayi created a new branch in Malayalam literature called 'Jeevithamezhuth'(Life sketch).
The work  of Thaha Madayi was included into The Oxford India Anthology of Malayalam Dalit Writing published by Oxford University Press.

Major works

Books 

 Desame Desame Ivarude Jeevitha varthamanam kelkk
 Nagna Jeevithangal
 Mamukkoya
 Jeevitham/Mamukkoya-Kozhikode
 Daivathinum Kadalinum Madhye
 Asoka Chottile Kunjunni
 Zakariya Vathil Thurakunnu
 Adhikaram, Anuragam, Athma Rahasyangal
 Shareeram chila pularkala swapnangal
 Punathilinte badal jeevitham
 Kanneerinte kanakku pusthakam
 Priyapetta sambhashanagal
 Sathyan Anthikadinte Grameenam
 Swapnadanam Cinemayum Jeevithavum
 Jeevitham Padunna Gramaphone
 25 Asadharana Jeevithanagal
 Kaari
 Butterfly's park
 Malakkam Mariyunna jeevitham
 Krishna Leela
 Mukham
 Udo Baba

short-films and documentaries 

 Anayupappa
 Enikku pooviloode madanganam
 Paattu krishi

Awards 
His book Mamukkoya (2007) won him the best book award at the International Book Fair in Thiruvananthapuram, as also the Malayala Manorama Editors Choice Award and Basheerinte Ediye in their respective years of publication (2009).

References

External links

 Mathrubhumi Books 
 Kanneerinte Kanakkupusthakam 

Malayalam-language writers
People from Kerala
Malayali people